Drugovac  is a village in the municipality of Smederevo, Serbia. According to the 2011 census, the village has a population of 1625 people.

References

Populated places in Podunavlje District